Year of Explorers is the second studio album by the Scottish electro rock band The Magnificents.

Track listing
All tracks written by The Magnificents.
 "Ring Ring Oo Oo" – 4:57
 "Can't Explode" – 3:11
 "Get It Boy" – 3:22
 "No Dialogue With Cunts" – 2:50
 "How Longs Gone" – 3:58
 "(......)" – 1:15
 "Yellow Hand" – 3:04
 "Year Of Explorers" – 3:53
 "Dedridge Cowboys" – 3:33
 "Learn One Thing" – 3:31	
 "Tiger Choir" – 4:04

Production
Tracks 1, 3 and 8 were recorded at Metway Studios, Brighton, with Damian Taylor producing. All other tracks were produced by John Cummings and The Magnificents at Castle of Doom Studios, Glasgow, and the M- Bunker, Edinburgh.

US Release
Mush Records re-released the album in America on 9 December 2008 on the imprint The Scottish Legion Of Illuminated Magnificents. This is the first in a series of releases of the bands back catalogue.

References

2007 albums
The Magnificents (Scottish band) albums